First Summit of the Organization of Islamic Cooperation on Science and Technology 
The first OIC Summit took place on September 10–11, 2017 under the slogan "Science, Technology, Innovation and Modernization in the Islamic World" and was coincided with the closure of The International specialized exhibition Expo 2017.

Background 

The summit was held in the Palace of Independence (Astana).

Initiative 

President of Kazakhstan Nursultan Nazarbayev for the first time announced this initiative during his speech at the OIC Summit in Istanbul on April 14–15, 2016.

The goals of the Summit 

Convening of the Summit at the level of heads of state and government is aimed at developing cooperation between the member states of the Organization in the field of science, technology, innovation and modernization, including active involvement of advanced world experience. The Summit consisted of four working sessions on the following topics: "The growing influence of science on society’s life in the 21st century," "The role of science and technology in ensuring sustainable development," "Competition and innovation in the modern economy," and "Development of cooperation in science and technology."

The participants 
The Summit was attended by 56 OIC member countries, including the heads of state of Azerbaijan, Turkey, Iran, Saudi Arabia, Pakistan, Uzbekistan and representatives of international and regional organizations.

Results 
The Summit adopted the Astana Declaration, which is designed to provide political support for scientific and technological modernization in the Islamic world. The ceremony of awarding the OIC Prize to outstanding scientists who contributed to the development of science and technology tool place during the event. At the initiative of the Turkish delegation, there had been prepared a final report on the issue of Rohingya Muslims of Myanmar.

References 

 OIC official web site
 Astana declaration
 Kazakhstan hosts First OIC Summit on Science and Technology
 Sudan: First OIC Summit On Science and Technology Kicks Off in Astana, Kazakhstan
 Meeting with OIC Secretary Gereral

Organisation of Islamic Cooperation
International conferences in Kazakhstan
Diplomatic conferences in Kazakhstan